Lucio Tasca d'Almerita (9 January 1940 – 25 July 2022) was an Italian winemaker and equestrian. He was known by many in his native Sicily as "Conte Lucio".

Early life
Tasca was born in Palermo, Sicily into a winemaking family. He attended high school in Lausanne, Switzerland, before attending the University of Palermo, where he graduated in Economics and Commerce.

Winemaking
In 1961, Tasca founded Regaleali, the company that later became Conte Tasca d'Almerita. In 2002, he founded Assovini Sicilia, an association of Sicilian winemakers. He died in Palermo, aged 82.

Equestrian
Tasca competed in the team and individual eventing events at the 1960 Summer Olympics.

References

External links

1940 births
2022 deaths
Italian male equestrians
Italian winemakers
Olympic equestrians of Italy
Equestrians at the 1960 Summer Olympics
Sportspeople from Palermo
University of Palermo alumni